George Thomas Allon (27 August 1899 – 1983) was a footballer who played in the Football League for Coventry City and Northampton Town. He also played for Wigan Athletic, making 41 appearances in the Cheshire League.

References

1899 births
1983 deaths
People from Blyth, Northumberland
Footballers from Northumberland
Association football wing halves
English footballers
Usworth Colliery A.F.C. players
Coventry City F.C. players
Nuneaton Borough F.C. players
Peterborough & Fletton United F.C. players
Northampton Town F.C. players
Wigan Athletic F.C. players
English Football League players